Ellame En Rasathan ("Everything is to my liking") is a 1995 Indian Tamil-language drama film produced and directed by Rajkiran. The film stars Rajkiran, Sangita and Roopa Sree. It was released on 14 April 1995 and emerged a box-office hit. The film was remade in Telugu as Soggadi Pellam (1996).

Plot 
Singarasu comes to a remote village with his daughter. Singarasu looks for his wife's murderer and only his daughter witnessed the murderer Mookaiyan. Although, Mookaiyan follows them to kill the witness. Meanwhile, the daughter of the village chief Chinna Raani falls in love with Singarasu.

In the past, Singarasu was the gram panchayat president: he was a rough and irresponsible man who spent a lot of time playing rummy, but he was a kind-hearted man. The rowdy Mookaiyan killed a newborn girl in the other village and supported female infanticide. Later, Singarasu clashed with the other village's chief Ayya for supporting this practice. To punish Ayya, Singarasu kidnapped his daughter Raani and sequestered her in his house. Ayya then called the police to arrest the murderer Mookaiyan and Mookaiyan was sent to jail. Thereafter, Raani fell in love with Singarasu and refused to go back home. Singarasu married Raani but he was still an irresponsible man. Later, Singarasu decided to work hard and he became a respected man in the village. Upon his release from the jail, Mookaiyan decided to take revenge on Singarasu so he murdered his innocent wife Raani.

Back to the present, Singarasu clearly objects to wed Chinna Raani and he is determined to punish the heartless Mookaiyan. What transpires later forms the crux of the story.

Cast 

Rajkiran as Singarasu
Sangita as Raani
 Baby Neethu Praveen as Singarasu (Rajkiran) daughter
Roopa Sree as Chinna Raani
Vadivelu as Vadivelu
R. Sundarrajan
K. R. Vijaya as Singarasu's grandmother
Vittal Rao as Ayya
Sooriyan as Mookaiyan
Periya Karuppu Thevar
Vellai Subbaiah
Kollangudi Karuppayee
Bayilvan Ranganathan
Manohar
Baby neethu praveen as Singarasu's daughter
Baby Anusha as Singarasu's daughter
Kanal Kannan as Rogue (special appearance)

Production 
Rajkiran initially planned the film to revolve around female infanticide; however after he came to know Karuthamma revolving around the same theme got released, he made changes in the script.

Soundtrack 
The music was composed by Ilaiyaraaja, with lyrics written by Vaali, Pulamaipithan and Ponnadiyan.

Reception 
New Straits Times wrote "Ellame En Rasah Thaan has a rather slow beginning and takes too much time coming to the point but [..] there is a following for this type of family-oriented movie". Kalki reviewed the film more positively, praising Ilaiyaraaja's music and the absence of obscene comedy, dances and disgusting events.

References

External links 

1990s Tamil-language films
1995 drama films
1995 films
Films scored by Ilaiyaraaja
Indian drama films
Tamil films remade in other languages